Megan Cunningham (born 14 July 1995) is a Scottish football goalkeeper who plays for Partick Thistle in the Scottish Women's Premier League (SWPL), on loan from Rangers She has two caps for Scotland.

Club career
Cunningham signed for Celtic in March 2009, but moved to Hamilton Academical in February 2012 to get more playing time. She moved to Glasgow City for the 2015 season before returning to Celtic for the 2016 season. Cunningham signed for Rangers in December 2019, ahead of the 2020 season. She joined Partick Thistle on loan at the start of the 2022 season.

International career
Cunningham has two Scotland international caps. She made her debut on her first call-up in a friendly against Northern Ireland away on 8 February 2015, when she was subbed on in minute 63. At the 2015 Cyprus Cup she played a full match against Italy. She represented Scotland as well at under-17 level and under-19 level.

References

External links 

 Megan Cunningham at UEFA.com

1995 births
Living people
Scottish women's footballers
Scotland women's international footballers
Celtic F.C. Women players
Glasgow City F.C. players
Women's association football goalkeepers
Hamilton Academical W.F.C. players